Ignazio Hugford, or Ignatius Heckford (1703–1778), was an Italian painter active mostly in Tuscany in an early Neoclassic style.

Life and work 
Ignazio Hugford was born in Pisa, the son of a resident English watchmaker who worked for the House of Medici.

Hugford was at the age of 9 an apprentice with Anton Domenico Gabbiani. In 1745, he painted over a dozen canvases for the refectory of the Benedictine Abbey of Vallombrosa, where his brother, Ferdinando Enrico, became abbot. Hugford was also instrumental in the development of techniques for scagliola. Hugford joined the Accademia del Disegno of Florence, and published a biography on his mentor. He was also involved in designs for works in scagliola. Among his masterpieces in painting is the Countess Matilde Donates her Riches to the Church in the church of San Bartolommeo in Pantano in Pistoia. In the same Pistoiese church are canvasses of St. Peter crosses the fire and Sant'Atto receives the relics of San Jacopo.  The Pieve di S. Andrea a Doccia houses an altarpiece of Saints Charles Borromeo, Philip Neri and Antonio Abate before a Crucifix (1776). His Tobias Returns Sight to his Father (c. 1741) can be found in the Church of Santa Felicita, Florence.

Hugford died in Florence. Nowadays he is more known as a critic, art scholar, and for his efforts as an agent for collectors. Among his pupils were Francesco Bartolozzi, Lamberto Cristiano Gori, Giovanni Battista Cipriani (Giuseppe Cipriani), and Sante Pacini.

Notes

References
Giovanna Perini, "Dresden and the Italian art market in the eighteenth century: Ignazio Hugford and Giovanni Ludovic Harrier eagles",  The Burlington Magazine , 1993, vol. 135, not. 1085, pp. 550–559.
 Bruce Cole; Ulrich Middeldorf. Masaccio, Lippi, or Hugford?,
The Burlington Magazine (1971)  pp. 500–505, 507.

1703 births
1778 deaths
People from Pisa
18th-century Italian painters
Italian male painters
Painters from Tuscany
Italian neoclassical painters
Italian people of English descent
Italian art critics
Italian art historians
18th-century Italian male artists